Caryophyllene, more formally (−)-β-caryophyllene, (BCP), is a natural bicyclic sesquiterpene that is a constituent of many essential oils, especially clove oil, the oil from the stems and flowers of Syzygium aromaticum (cloves), the essential oil of Cannabis sativa, rosemary, and hops. It is usually found as a mixture with isocaryophyllene (the cis double bond isomer) and α-humulene (obsolete name: α-caryophyllene), a ring-opened isomer.  Caryophyllene is notable for having a cyclobutane ring, as well as a trans-double bond in a 9-membered ring, both rarities in nature.

β-Caryophyllene acts as a full agonist of the Cannabinoid receptor type 2 (CB2 receptor) in rats. β-Caryophyllene has a binding affinity of Ki = 155nM at the CB2 receptors in mice. β-Caryophyllene has been shown to have anti-inflammatory action linked to its CB2 receptor activity in a study comparing the pain killing effects in mice with and without CB2 receptors with the group of mice without CB2 receptors seeing little benefit compared to the mice with functional CB2 receptors. β-Caryophyllene has the highest cannabinoid activity compared to the ring opened isomer α-caryophyllene which may modulate CB2 activity. To compare binding, Cannabinol (CBN) binds to the CB2 receptors as a partial agonist with an affinity of CB2 Ki = 126.4 nM while Delta-9-Tetrahydrocannabinol binds to the CB2 receptors as a partial agonist with an affinity of Ki = 36nM.

The first total synthesis of caryophyllene in 1964 by E. J. Corey was considered one of the classic demonstrations of the possibilities of synthetic organic chemistry at the time.

Caryophyllene is one of the chemical compounds that contributes to the aroma of black pepper.

Caryophyllene has been given GRAS (generally regarded as safe) designation by the FDA and is approved by the FDA for use as a food additive, typically for flavoring.

Caryophyllene helps to improve cold tolerance at low ambient temperatures. Wild giant pandas frequently roll in horse manure, which contains beta-caryophyllene/caryophyllene oxide, to inhibit transient receptor potential melastatin 8 (TRPM8), an archetypical cold-activated ion channel of mammals.

Metabolism and derivatives
14-Hydroxycaryophyllene oxide (C15H24O2) was isolated from the urine of rabbits treated with (−)-caryophyllene (C15H24). The X-ray crystal structure of 14-hydroxycaryophyllene (as its acetate derivative) has been reported.

The metabolism of caryophyllene progresses through (−)-caryophyllene oxide (C15H24O) since the latter compound also afforded 14-hydroxycaryophyllene (C15H24O) as a metabolite.

Caryophyllene (C15H24) → caryophyllene oxide (C15H24O) → 14-hydroxycaryophyllene (C15H24O) → 14-hydroxycaryophyllene oxide (C15H24O2).

Caryophyllene oxide, in which the alkene group of caryophyllene has become an epoxide, is the component responsible for cannabis identification by drug-sniffing dogs and is also an approved food additive, often as flavoring.

Natural sources
The approximate quantity of caryophyllene in the essential oil of each source is given in square brackets ([ ]):
Cannabis (Cannabis sativa) [3.8–37.5% of cannabis flower essential oil]
Black caraway (Carum nigrum) [7.8%]
Cloves (Syzygium aromaticum) [1.7–19.5% of clove bud essential oil]
Hops (Humulus lupulus) [5.1–14.5%]
Basil (Ocimum spp.) [5.3–10.5% O. gratissimum; 4.0–19.8% O. micranthum]
Oregano (Origanum vulgare) [4.9–15.7%]
Black pepper (Piper nigrum) [7.29%]
Lavender (Lavandula angustifolia) [4.62–7.55% of lavender oil]
Rosemary (Rosmarinus officinalis) [0.1–8.3%]
True cinnamon (Cinnamomum zeylanicum) [6.9–11.1%]
Malabathrum (Cinnamomum tamala) [25.3%]
Ylang-ylang (Cananga odorata)  [3.1–10.7%]
Copaiba oil (Copaifera)

Biosynthesis 
Caryophyllene is a common sesquiterpene among plant species. It is biosynthesized from the common terpene precursors dimethylallyl pyrophosphate (DMAPP) and isopentenyl pyrophosphate (IPP). First, single units of DMAPP and IPP are reacted via an SN1-type reaction with the loss of pyrophosphate, catalyzed by the enzyme GPPS2, to form geranyl pyrophosphate (GPP). This further reacts with a second unit of IPP, also via an SN1-type reaction catalyzed by the enzyme IspA, to form farnesyl pyrophosphate (FPP). Finally, FPP undergoes QHS1 enzyme-catalyzed intramolecular cyclization to form caryophyllene.

Compendial status
 Food Chemicals Codex

Notes and references

Flavors
Cannabinoids
Sesquiterpenes
Alkene derivatives
Hydrocarbons
CB2 receptor agonists
Cyclobutanes